The Empire Exhibition Trophy was a football competition held in 1938 in conjunction with the Empire Exhibition, Scotland 1938 in Glasgow. It was held to commemorate the Exhibition, then underway in Bellahouston Park, and the prize was a solid silver model of the Tait Tower.

Four teams from Scotland and four from England contested the straight knock out competition. Brentford took the place of fellow London club Arsenal, who elected to withdraw. Celtic defeated Everton 1–0 in the final, on 10 June 1938, with a goal from Johnny Crum in extra-time. The final was watched by a crowd of over 82,000 at Ibrox Park. This tournament, like the later Coronation Cup, was held in very high regard at the time as it gave teams the opportunity to test themselves against teams from other leagues in the days before European football.

Entrants

Quarter-finals
 Celtic 0 – 0 (a.e.t.)   Sunderland
 Aberdeen 4 – 1  Chelsea
 Everton 2 – 0  Rangers
 Hearts 1 – 0  Brentford

Replay
 Celtic 3 – 1 (a.e.t.) Sunderland

Semi-finals

Final

Teams

See also
1888 Glasgow Exhibition Cup, similar tournament in 1888
Glasgow International Exhibition Cup, similar tournament in 1901
Edinburgh Exhibition Cup, similar tournament in 1908
Saint Mungo Cup, similar tournament in 1951
Coronation Cup (football), similar tournament in 1953
Football World Championship, the first tournament featuring English and Scottish teams.

References

1937–38 in Scottish football
1937–38 in English football
International club association football competitions hosted by Scotland
International sports competitions in Glasgow
Defunct football cup competitions in Scotland
Football in Glasgow